Vice-Admiral of the United Kingdom is an honorary office generally held by a senior Royal Navy admiral. The title holder is the official deputy to the Lord High Admiral, an honorary (although once operational) office which was vested in the Sovereign from 1964 to 2011 and which was subsequently held by the Duke of Edinburgh. Vice-Admirals are appointed by the Sovereign on the nomination of the First Sea Lord.

History
The office was originally created on 25 April 1513, by Tudor King Henry VIII. The office holder served as the deputy of the Lord High Admiral from April 1546 when the incumbent jointly held the title of Lieutenant of the Admiralty, though not always simultaneously. From 1557 to 1558 Vice-Admiral Sir John Clere of Ormesby, Kt. was appointed Vice-Admiral of England by patent but not appointed Lieutenant of the Admiralty. The post was in abeyance until 1661; from then on, appointments became more regular and in 1672 the two separate distinct offices were amalgamated into one unified office, though both titles remained. The responsibilities of the pre-1964 Board of Admiralty would, in theory, have devolved upon the Vice-Admiral had the entire Board been incapacitated before a new Commission of Admiralty could pass the Great Seal. However, such a contingency never occurred in practice.

In former days, the Vice-Admiral of England (or Vice-Admiral of Great Britain following the 1707 union with Scotland) was the second most powerful position in the Royal Navy, and until 1801 was officially called the Lieutenant of the Admiralty.

Below the office of Vice-Admiral ranks the Rear-Admiral of the United Kingdom, another now honorary office.

Vice-Admirals of England
 Vice-Admiral William FitzWilliam 25 April 1513 – 1536 
Post in abeyance
 Vice-Admiral Sir Thomas Clere April 1546 – December 1552 
 Vice-Admiral Sir William Woodhouse, December 1552 – 1557 
 Vice-Admiral Sir John Clere of Ormesby, Kt. 1557 – 1558 
Post in abeyance
 Vice-Admiral Sir Richard Leveson April 1604 - July 1605 
Post in abeyance
 Vice-Admiral Sir Robert Mansel 1618 – 1648 
Post in abeyance
 Vice-Admiral Edward Montagu, 1st Earl of Sandwich 1 April 1661 – 28 May 1672
 Vice-Admiral Prince Rupert of the Rhine 15 August 1672 – 19 November 1682
 Vice-Admiral Henry FitzRoy, 1st Duke of Grafton 2 December 1682 – 1689 
 Vice-Admiral Arthur Herbert, 1st Earl of Torrington 14 September 1689 – 18 December 1690
vacant?
 Vice-Admiral Edward Russell, 1st Earl of Orford 9 November 1693 – ?
 Vice-Admiral Sir George Rooke 1702 – 1 May 1707

Vice-Admirals of Great Britain
Sir George Rooke 1 May 1707 – 24 January 1709?
James Berkeley, 3rd Earl of Berkeley 21 March 1719 N.S. – 17 August 1736
Sir John Norris April 1739 – 14 June 1749
George Anson, 1st Baron Anson 4 July 1749 – 6 June 1762
Henry Osborn 4 January 1763 – 1765
Edward Hawke, 1st Baron Hawke 5 November 1765 – 16 October 1781
George Brydges Rodney, 1st Baron Rodney 6 November 1781 – 24 May 1792
Richard Howe, 1st Earl Howe 9 June 1792 – March 1796
Alexander Hood, 1st Viscount Bridport March 1796 – 1801

Vice-Admirals of the United Kingdom

Alexander Hood, 1st Viscount Bridport 1 January 1801 – 2 May 1814
Sir William Cornwallis 14 May 1814 – 5 July 1819
Sir William Young 18 July 1819 – 25 October 1821
James Saumarez, 1st Baron de Saumarez 21 November 1821 – 15 February 1832
Edward Pellew, 1st Viscount Exmouth  15 February 1832 – 23 January 1833
Sir Edward Thornbrough 30 January 1833 – 3 April 1834
Sir George Martin April 1834 – 9 November 1846
Sir Davidge Gould 17 November 1846 – 23 April 1847
Sir Robert Stopford 5 May 1847 – 25 June 1847
Sir George Martin 10 July 1847 – 28 July 1847
Sir Thomas Byam Martin 10 August 1847 – 21 October 1854
Sir William Hall Gage 6 November 1854 – 20 May 1862
Sir Graham Hamond, 2nd Baronet 5 June 1862 – 10 November 1862
Sir Francis William Austen 11 December 1862 – 27 April 1863
Sir Thomas John Cochrane 16 May 1863 – 12 September 1865
Sir George Francis Seymour 23 September 1865 – 20 November 1866
Sir William Bowles 26 November 1866 – 15 January 1869
Sir George Rose Sartorius 1 March 1869 – 3 July 1869
Sir Fairfax Moresby 17 July 1869 – 21 January 1870
Sir Provo Wallis 12 February 1870 – 15 January 1876
Sir Michael Seymour 15 January 1876 – 23 February 1887

1876: Abolished under Queen Victoria

1901: Revived by King Edward VII

Sir Michael Culme-Seymour, 3rd Baronet 25 July 1901 – 1920 
Sir Francis Bridgeman 1920 – 17 February 1929
Sir Stanley Cecil James Colville 25 March 1929 – 13 February 1939
Sir Montague Edmund Browning 13 February 1939 – 19 June 1945
Sir Martin Dunbar-Nasmith 19 June 1945 – 12 October 1962
Sir John Hereward Edelsten 12 October 1962 – 11 March 1966
Sir John Peter Lorne Reid 11 March 1966 – 11 January 1973
Sir Deric Holland-Martin 11 January 1973 – 12 April 1976
Sir Nigel Stuart Henderson 12 April 1976 – 1 August 1979
Sir John Fitzroy Duyland Bush 1 August 1979 – 1984
Sir William Donough O'Brien 1984 – 13 November 1986
Sir Leslie Derek Empson 13 November 1986 – 29 October 1988
Sir Anthony Templer Frederick Griffith Griffin 29 October 1988 – 24 November 1988
Sir Anthony Storrs Morton 24 November 1988 – 17 January 1994
Sir James Henry Fuller Eberle 17 January 1994 – 6 November 1997
Sir Nicholas John Streynsham Hunt 6 November 1997 – 30 April 2001
Sir Jeremy Black 30 April 2001 – 2005
Sir James Burnell-Nugent 2005 – 2007
Sir Mark Stanhope 2007 – 2009
Sir Trevor Soar 2009 – 2012
Sir George Zambellas January–April 2012
Sir Donald Gosling 2 April 2012 – 16 September 2019
Michael Boyce, Baron Boyce 6 December 2021 – 6 November 2022

References

Titles
Royal Navy
Royal Navy appointments
Admiral of the United Kingdom
Maritime history of the United Kingdom